The Olmsted Locks and Dam is a locks and wicket dam on the Ohio River at river mile 964.4. The project is intended to reduce tow and barge delays by replacing the existing older, and frequently congested, locks and dams Number 52 and Number 53. The locks are located about 17 miles upstream from the confluence of the Ohio and Mississippi rivers at Olmsted, Illinois.

The project is operational while the removal of Locks and Dams 52 and 53 should be completed around 2020. The project is both the largest and the most expensive inland waterway project ever undertaken in the United States.

History

The US Congress, through the Water Resources Development Act of 1988 first approved a $775 million budget for the project in 1988 (October 1987 Price Levels).

According to the US Army Corps of Engineers, the new dam and locks will reduce passage time to under one hour with the new system.  Due to queuing at Lock and Dam Number 52 and Lock and Dam Number 53, it can take cargo traffic 15 to 20 hours each to transit the locks the Olmsted complex is intended to replace.

When initiated the complex was projected to cost $775 million.  As of February 2018, the estimated cost of the project is over $3 billion.

While the project was initially scheduled for completion in 1998, by 2016 it was projected to become operational between 2018 and by 2020, Locks and Dams 52 and 53 would be decommissioned.

The United States Army Corps of Engineers (USACE), the federal agency responsible for maintaining navigation on the USA's rivers, estimates the delay in completing the project results in a yearly loss of about $640 million to $800 million in lost benefits to the nation. While calculating these benefits is complex because of the amount of variables considered, it essentially takes into account the reduced costs industry (or businesses using the river for commerce) would experience if the Olmsted Project was operational versus the current means of transit through the aging and often unreliable Locks and Dams 52 and 53. These benefits further calculate the reduced costs in moving cargo through the river versus the next available cheapest alternative, usually by rail or by truck.

In-the-wet construction 
The Locks and Dams 52 and 53 Replacement Project, better known as the Olmsted Locks and Dam Project makes use of the innovative in-the-wet construction. When a dam is constructed on a small river, engineers usually create a cofferdam (or an enclosure) within a river and drain the water out of it to facilitate construction. However, building this entire project through the use of cofferdams would have been incredibly disruptive to river traffic. As the largest transit point in the nation's river system where approximately 90 million tons of goods pass through each year, blocking large parts of the river would have caused major delays to river traffic even more so than evidenced at Locks and Dams 52 and 53.

Engineers instead chose to construct the dam portion of the project using the in-the-wet technique, where concrete portions of the dam itself were built offsite at a concrete casting yard, transported into the river for placement, and placed on the bottom of the river, all with minimal disruption to the river.

Problems with the project – cost increases 
This has been perhaps the longest and largest civil works project in the history of the Corps of Engineers. Multiple delays, especially in funding have created a 30 year endeavor that has been inflated from a $700+ million price tag to over $3 billion in early 2018.

The biggest contributors to these increases have been:
 Delays in funding and lack of availability of appropriations
 Costs increases of materials over time
 Low initial budget proposal for the project (engineers underestimated the initial costs of the project)
 In-the-wet construction
 Cost-reimbursable contracts (where the Government carries the majority of the risk of development)
 Unforeseen engineering problems
 Stretching of the budget (the USACE had and has other projects that require funds which were in turn taken away from Olmsted)
 Inflation
 Changes in design to the project
 Unpredictable river conditions

See also
 List of locks and dams of the Ohio River

References

External links
 Olmsted Locks and Dam project on the USACE website
 Olmsted Locks and Dam locality map
 Olmsted Dam Construction on Flickr

Buildings and structures in Ballard County, Kentucky
Buildings and structures in Pulaski County, Illinois
Ohio River
Dams in Illinois
Dams in Kentucky
United States Army Corps of Engineers dams
Locks of Illinois
Locks of Kentucky